Bash Qeshlaq (also Romanized as Bāsh Qeshlāq, and Bāsh Qishlāq; also known as Bashkishlak) is a village in, and serves as the capital of, Qeshlaqat-e Afshar Rural District of Afshar District of Khodabandeh County, Zanjan province, Iran. At the 2006 National Census, its population was 185 in 45 households. The following census in 2011 counted 273 people in 35 households. The latest census in 2016 showed a population of 144 people in 33 households.

References 

Khodabandeh County

Populated places in Zanjan Province

Populated places in Khodabandeh County